Star Trek III Sourcebook Update is a 1984 role-playing game supplement for Star Trek: The Role Playing Game published by FASA.

Contents
Star Trek III Sourcebook Update is a supplement incorporating into ST:RPG the changes and additions to the Star Trek universe shown in the first three Star Trek movies.

Reception
William A. Barton reviewed Star Trek III Sourcebook Update in Space Gamer No. 70. Barton commented that "ST:RPG players who enjoy the movies as much as (or more than) the series will find this supplement an excellent addition to the game, and even those who intend to keep their campaigns set in the time of the TV series can find enough useful data here to make this a most worthwhile Trek purchase."

Reviews
Different Worlds #39 (May/June, 1985)

References

Role-playing game supplements introduced in 1984
Star Trek: The Role Playing Game supplements